Wonderful Town is a 1953 musical with book written by Joseph A. Fields and Jerome Chodorov, lyrics by Betty Comden and Adolph Green, and music by Leonard Bernstein. The musical tells the story of two sisters who aspire to be a writer and actress respectively, seeking success from their basement apartment in New York City's Greenwich Village. It is based on Fields and Chodorov's 1940 play My Sister Eileen, which in turn originated from autobiographical short stories by Ruth McKenney first published in The New Yorker in the late 1930s and later published in book form as My Sister Eileen. Only the last two stories in McKenney's book were used, and they were heavily modified.

After a pre-Broadway try-out at the Forrest Theatre in Philadelphia, Wonderful Town premiered on Broadway in 1953, starring Rosalind Russell in the role of Ruth Sherwood, Edie Adams as Eileen Sherwood, and George Gaynes as Robert Baker. It won five Tony Awards, including Best Musical and Best Actress, and spawned three New York City Center productions between 1958 and 1966, the 1955 and 1986 West End production and 2003 Broadway revival.  It is a lighter piece than Bernstein's later works, West Side Story and Candide, but none of the songs have become as popular.

Synopsis
Act I
During the summer of 1935 in Greenwich Village, New York, a tour guide leads a group of sightseers on a tour of "Christopher Street" and its colorful residents.  

When the tourists have departed, the witty Ruth Sherwood arrives in Greenwich Village with Eileen, her younger sister. The two have just arrived from Columbus, Ohio, determined to forge a life in New York City as a writer (Ruth) and an actress (Eileen). Soon they are living in a basement apartment, recently vacated by Violet, lent by the landlord, Mr. Appopolous. Their apartment building is shaken frequently by dynamite from the construction of a subway underneath them and they are disturbed by Violet's returning customers. The sisters are soon stricken with homesickness for "Ohio".

The next morning, Ruth and Eileen set out to try their hand at "Conquering New York", only to find defeat and humiliation. Eileen, at least, has gotten food from a food samples man, as well as Mr. Valenti, but has also met Frank Lippencott, a local Walgreens manager who has developed a crush on her. Ruth, however, is left to wonder at her sister's magnetic appeal and her own unique romantic abilities — a talent for repelling men so successful that she could write a book entitled "One Hundred Easy Ways to Lose a Man."

Eventually, Ruth talks her way into the offices of a short story magazine, where she meets Bob Baker. Bob likes Ruth, but advises her that she has little chance of success, and  tells her flat out what a waste of money and time it was to come to New York City, because he along with many others have done the same thing ("What a Waste"). Undaunted, Ruth leaves three stories with Bob in the hope that he will read them.

Meanwhile, Eileen has been eating all of her lunches free at Walgreens, and finds herself infatuated with Frank ("A Little Bit in Love"), and invites him over to dinner so Ruth can have free lunches when she goes to Walgreens, too. Bob arrives at the apartment, looking for Ruth, and Eileen invites him over for dinner as well. The phone rings, and it is Chick Clark, a newspaper editor, whom Eileen met in an elevator, wanting to see Eileen.

The upstairs neighbors, Wreck, an out-of-season American football player ("Pass the Football"), and his live-in lover, Helen, ask the girls to hide Wreck while Helen's mother, Mrs. Ella Wade is in town, because Mrs. Wade does not yet know about Wreck. Eileen happily agrees to stow him in their apartment, much to Ruth's hesitation. Wreck describes his lucky history as a student at Trenton Tech, who got by very well only because of his ability with football.

Eileen has invited Frank Lippencott, Bob Baker, and Chick Clark, a slimy newspaper scribe whom she has met with the object of furthering Ruth's career, over for potluck supper. Unaware of each other's feelings, both women find themselves attracted to Bob. Soon, all five of them are seated around the cramped apartment trying to fill the awkward silence ("Conversation Piece"). Meanwhile, Helen deals with her overbearing and exaggerated mother.

Ruth and Bob talk over the quality of her stories, and he advises her to write about what she knows rather than flights of fancy. Both say several wrong things, and he finally tells her off. He soon regrets it as Ruth rushes inside in tears  ("A Quiet Girl").

While all this is happening, anxious to be alone with Eileen, Chick Clark creates a bogus assignment for Ruth. He sends her off to the Brooklyn Navy Yard to interview a group of Brazilian navy cadets. She quickly realizes that their sole interest is to learn and dance the "Conga!".  The sailors follow Ruth home, where the girls soon find themselves in chaotic confusion, as all the citizens of Christopher Street join the conga line in a finale. Ruth runs into Bob and gives him a piece of her mind, while Eileen is hauled off to jail for causing the riot.

Act II
In the local jail Eileen finds herself practically running the place, with Officer Lonigan and his brigade of doting Irish police officers at her beck and call. Given her name, they are convinced that she is Irish; they serenade her and are not the least discouraged when she says she is not Irish ("My Darlin' Eileen"). Ruth comes to assure her that she will bail her out as soon as she collects the money from her new job as a promoter for the Village Vortex, a local nightclub. At the club, Ruth digs the rhythm of swing ("Wonderful Town Swing"). Meanwhile, Wreck is awkwardly masquerading as a wealthy art collector to meet the approval of Helen's mother, and Chick is frantically calling Eileen, trying to make things right.

Thanks to Bob, Eileen is soon released from jail, and the sisters learn that Appopolous has been so scandalized by a missing picture that he painted (that was actually stolen and sold for $2 by Helen and Wreck for Wreck to stay at the Y) as well as Eileen's arrest that he has threatened to evict them. Eileen discovers that Ruth is also attracted to Bob Baker, and the two of them wish, for a moment, that they had never left home ("Ohio" (reprise)). Eileen is then confronted by the rhythmical Speedy Valenti, owner of the Village Vortex (the night club), who arranges for her New York City debut as a singer because her fame has reached the front page of the news. Appopolous immediately changes his tune now that one of his tenants has a paying job, and extends their lease.

Eileen soon learns that Bob Baker has quit his job as a result of a disagreement with his boss about Ruth's story on the Brazilian sailors. Eileen is thrilled that Bob quit his job and assures the unbelieving Bob that it's love that he feels for Ruth. Bob, faced with the facts, hesitantly realizes the truth that it is love ("It's Love").

The mood at the Vortex turns jazzy ("Ballet At the Village Vortex"). Eileen finds herself with a case of stage fright and she convinces Ruth to join her on stage to sing. Chick arrives to make amends and presents Ruth with a press pass: His boss has read her story about the Brazilian sailors and loved it, and given Ruth a job to take on the following Monday. The Vortex is alive with singing and dancing ("Wrong Note Rag"), and Bob decides it is the perfect moment to let Ruth know how he feels. The curtain closes as Eileen and the guests at the club sing "It's Love" along with everyone in a finale in celebration of Ruth's and Bob's newfound affection.

Musical numbers

Act I
 Overture — Orchestra
 Christopher Street — Tour Guide and Villagers
 Ohio — Ruth Sherwood and Eileen Sherwood
 Conquering New York — Ruth, Eileen, First Cadet, Violet and Villagers*
 One Hundred Easy Ways — Ruth
 What a Waste — Bob Baker and Associate Editors
 A Little Bit in Love — Eileen
 Pass the Football — Wreck and Villagers
 Conversation Piece — Ruth, Eileen, Frank Lippencott, Bob and Chick Clark*
 A Quiet Girl — Bob
 Quiet Ruth — Ruth
 Conga — Ruth and Brazilian Cadets

Act II
 Entr'acte — Orchestra
 My Darlin' Eileen — Eileen and Policemen
 Swing — Ruth and Villagers
 Ohio (Reprise) — Ruth and Eileen
 It's Love — Eileen, Bob and Villagers
 Ballet at the Village Vortex — Orchestra (danced by the ensemble)
 Wrong Note Rag — Ruth, Eileen and Villagers
 It's Love (Reprise) / Finale — Eileen, Bob, Ruth and Entire Company

"Conquering New York" and "Conversation Piece" both quote Bernstein's piece for solo clarinet and jazz ensemble, "Prelude, Fugue, and Riffs", premiered by Benny Goodman in 1955.

Production history

Original Broadway production

Produced by Robert Fryer, the original production premiered at the Winter Garden Theatre on February 25, 1953, where it ran for 559 performances, closing on July 3, 1954. George Abbott served as director, with choreography by Donald Saddler. The original cast featured Rosalind Russell in the role of Ruth Sherwood, Edie Adams as Eileen Sherwood, and George Gaynes as Robert Baker. Carol Channing replaced Russell for the final 6 months of the run.

Original London production

The West End premiere opened at The Prince's Theatre on February 25, 1955, running for 207 performances starring Pat Kirkwood as Ruth, Shani Wallis as Eileen, and Sid James as Wreck. The musical was produced by Jack Hylton with Cyril Ornadel as music director.

1958 television production

On November 30, 1958, CBS Television broadcast a live special of the musical, with Rosalind Russell (Ruth Sherwood), Jackie McKeever (Eileen Sherwood), Sydney Chaplin (Bob Baker), and Jordan Bentley (the Wreck).

2003 Broadway revival

In May 2000 City Center Encores! presented a staged concert starring Donna Murphy and Laura Benanti. With direction and choreography by Kathleen Marshall, the production was well received, eventually leading to a full revival. Again directed by Marshall, the 2003 Broadway Revival opened at the Al Hirschfeld Theatre on November 23, 2003, and closed on January 30, 2005 after 497 performances. Murphy reprised her role as Ruth, with Jennifer Westfeldt as Eileen and Gregg Edelman as Robert. Brooke Shields took over the role of Ruth beginning September 28, 2004. As had happened when Shields was a replacement for Rizzo in the Broadway revival of  Grease, the cast album was re-released with Shields' voice replacing Murphy's.

Other productions

A West End revival starring Maureen Lipman opened at the Queen's Theatre in August 1986 and closed March 1987.

A Non-Equity National Tour was presented by Music Theatre Associates in 2006 and 2007.

Wonderful Town premiered on May 25, 2008 at the Shaw Festival in Niagara On The Lake, Ontario.

In 2012 the Hallé Concerts Society, the Royal Exchange Theatre, Manchester, and The Lowry, Salford Quays, mounted a joint production at the Lowry from 31 March to 21 April, with the Hallé Orchestra conducted by Sir Mark Elder. It then went on to tour the UK until 7 July. The cast included Connie Fisher, Lucy van Gasse and Michael Xavier. The production was directed by Braham Murray.

Mary Zimmerman directed the 2016 Goodman Theatre (Chicago) revival which previewed from September 10 to run September 20 to October 23: the cast included Bri Sudia (Ruth) Lauren Molina (Eileen), and Matt DeCaro (Appopoulos), the sets were designed by Todd Rosenthal. The production was staged with a 1950s - rather than 1930s - setting.

An off-West-End production was presented at Ye Olde Rose and Crown Theatre by All Star Productions in October 2016.

In Dec 2016, the Staatsoperette Dresden presents the premiere of a German version (book and lyrics translated by Roman Hinze)

Recordings
Though there have been only two major Broadway productions of Wonderful Town, many recordings of the music have been made over the years.

1953: The Original Broadway Cast with Rosalind Russell as Ruth.
1958: The CBS TV Movie Cast with Rosalind Russell as Ruth.
1986: The Original London Cast with Maureen Lipman as Ruth.
1998: A Studio Cast recording with Karen Mason as Ruth. The first complete recording of the score.
1999: A Studio Cast recording with Kim Criswell as Ruth and Audra McDonald as Eileen, with Thomas Hampson, and Rodney Gilfry. The recording is  conducted by Sir Simon Rattle.
2002: A live performance in Berlin on DVD with Kim Criswell as Ruth and Audra McDonald as Eileen, and with Thomas Hampson and Wayne Marshall, performed by the Berlin Philharmonic and conducted by Sir Simon Rattle.
2003: The cast recording of a new revival with Donna Murphy and Jennifer Westfeldt as Ruth and Eileen, respectively.
2004: A new recording of the 2003 production, with Brooke Shields and Jennifer Hope Wills as Ruth and Eileen, respectively. For this recording, the original orchestral tracks from the New Broadway recording were used, and only Ruth and Eileen's songs were rerecorded.
2017: Live recording with Danielle de Niese as Eileen and Alysha Umphress as Ruth, with Nathan Gunn as Bob, performed by the London Symphony Orchestra and Chorus conducted by Sir Simon Rattle.

Awards and nominations

Original Broadway production

1986 London production

2003 Broadway revival

See also 
Broadway Rose (panhandler)

Notes

References
NY Times review of 2000 Encores! production
Profile of the show at guidetomusicaltheatre.com
Wonderful Town at Bernstein site
Profile of the show from the Tams Witmark site
Time Magazine article about Russell and the show

External links

 (1958 TV film)
 The Best Musical Written in Five Weeks

1953 musicals
Broadway musicals
Musicals based on plays
Musicals by Leonard Bernstein
Musicals by Betty Comden and Adolph Green
Plays set in New York City
Tony Award for Best Musical
Tony Award-winning musicals